Mahadevsthan may refer to several places in Nepal.

Mahadevsthan, Dhading
Mahadevsthan, Kathmandu
Mahadevsthan, Sindhuli
Mahadevsthan, Baitadi
Mahadevsthan, Doti